Zhang Xuezhong (15 July 1899 – 16 June 1995) was a Kuomintang general who commanded a division in the important Battle of Taierzhuang. He also worked in the Taiwanese Ministry of National Defence later in his career.

Career
Zhang started his military career in November 1927 at 3rd battalion of Zhejiang Military Academy. He fought in multiple battles including Battle of Tengxian, Nankou Campaign and Battle of Taierzhuang during the Second Sino-Japanese War. The 89th division led by Zhang was one of the Chinese divisions modernized by Germans. Zhang was part of the 13th army's staff from March 1937 to July 1942.

Zhang also commanded his 89th division in the 1938 Battle of Taierzhuang, which was the first major Chinese victory in the Second Sino-Japanese War. He also fought to defend the Gaochengzhen–Taerwan line from April to May 1939.

In August 1948 Zhang started working as a counselor in the Ministry of National Defence, and a month later he was promoted to the rank of Lieutenant-General. This was his last promotion in military ranks. Zhang retired in January 1959, and died on 16 June 1995.

See also

List of army groups of the National Revolutionary Army
Sino-German cooperation until 1941

References

Further reading

1899 births
1995 deaths
Military personnel of the Republic of China in the Second Sino-Japanese War
National Revolutionary Army generals
Republic of China Army generals
Place of birth missing
Place of death missing